Seventy-Six Township is a township in Washington County, Iowa, USA.

History
Seventy-Six Township was organized in 1856. It takes its name from the congressional township of which it forms a part.

References

Townships in Washington County, Iowa
Townships in Iowa
1856 establishments in Iowa
Populated places established in 1856